J20 or J-20 may refer to:

Vehicles

Aircraft 
 Chengdu J-20, a Chinese fighter
 Reggiane J 20, an Italian fighter in service with the Swedish Air Force
 Soko J-20 Kraguj, a Yugoslavian light attack aircraft

Automobiles 
 Jeep J20, an American pickup truck
 Toyota Land Cruiser (J20), a Japanese off-road vehicle

Locomotives 
 LNER Class J20, a British steam locomotive class

Ships 
 , an Östergötland-class destroyer of the Swedish Navy
 , a Sandhayak-class survey ship of the Indian Navy

Other uses 
 Acute bronchitis
 County Route J20 (California)
 DisruptJ20, founded to protest the inauguration of Donald Trump in January 2017
 Elongated pentagonal cupola, a Johnson solid (J20)
 January 20, 2005 counter-inaugural protest, held in Washington, D.C. and other American cities
 Nissan J20, an automobile engine

See also
 J2O, with a letter "O" instead of a zero